The Port Washington Narrows is a tidal strait located in Bremerton, Washington, United States. The northwest entrance is marked on the west side by Rocky Point, and the southeast entrance is located at Point Turner on the west side and Point Herron on the east side. It is located between downtown Bremerton and  the Manette Peninsula.

It is through this  channel that Dyes Inlet drains into Sinclair Inlet and into Puget Sound.  Tidal currents attain velocities in excess of 4 knots at times.

The Narrows divide the city of Bremerton into east and west portions, which are connected by the Manette Bridge and the Warren Avenue Bridge. There are a number of petroleum distribution facilities with storage tanks and receiving wharves along the western shore of the Narrows between the Manette Bridge and Phinney Bay.

External links

Bremerton, Washington
Straits of Kitsap County, Washington
Straits of Washington (state)
Landforms of Puget Sound